10th NSFC Awards
December 29, 1975

Best Film: 
 Nashville 
The 10th National Society of Film Critics Awards, given on 29 December 1975, honored the best filmmaking of 1975.

Winners

Best Picture 
Nashville

Best Director 
Robert Altman – Nashville

Best Actor 
Jack Nicholson – One Flew Over the Cuckoo's Nest

Best Actress 
Isabelle Adjani – The Story of Adele H. (L'histoire d'Adèle H.)

Best Supporting Actor 
Henry Gibson – Nashville

Best Supporting Actress 
Lily Tomlin – Nashville

Best Screenplay 
Robert Towne and Warren Beatty – Shampoo

Best Cinematography 
John Alcott – Barry Lyndon

Special Award 
The Magic Flute (Trollflöjten)

References

External links
Past Awards

1975
National Society of Film Critics Awards
National Society of Film Critics Awards
National Society of Film Critics Awards